In the political science of the United States Congress, slurge is the arithmetic mean of retirement slump and sophomore surge. The term was coined by John Alford and David R. Brady in a 1988 academic paper.

The slurge is one of the more accurate means of measuring incumbency advantage in congressional elections.  If the "retirement slump" is the difference in percentage of the vote share between a retiring incumbent and a new candidate, and the "sophomore surge" is the difference in percentage between a new candidate's first campaign and second campaign as an incumbent, then the slurge, being an average of the two, indicates a higher incumbency advantage when higher.

Example of usage:
"The slurge was too high to miss, yet the American people did."

References

Alford, John and David R. Brady, 1988, Partisan and Incumbent Advantages in U.S. House Elections, 1846-1986, Working Paper No. 11, Center for the Study of Institutions and Values, Rice University. 

Terminology of the United States Congress